Kichamani MBA is a 2007 Indian Malayalam language action film directed by Samad Mankada. Starring Suresh Gopi, Jayasurya and Navya Nair in lead roles, produced by Hill Top Productions. It also has Biju Menon, Priyanka and Salim Kumar in supporting roles.

Plot

Kichamani a smooth talking wheeler-dealer who runs a big establishment specialized in bribing officials and making things done from government machinery. The MBA attached to his name is not the short form for the degree, but it stands for Member of Bachelor Association, as the hero is more a devotee of lord Ayappa. He has his parallel mechanisms in every government offices and with the passes issued by Kichamani, any one can get any deed done, ranging from getting job transfers, smuggling goods including liquor to booking a seat in private medical colleges.

Kichamani has his own reasons to think that the remedy for corruption is not anti corruption, but corruption itself. He believes in his experiences that he got since his childhood working with the bribery machinery in various offices. His immediate core group includes Ginnah, Bahuleyan, Udhayabhanu & Gopi. Devanarayanan, popularly called as Devanji, a shrewd politician, who treats politics as a part of his illegal business. Devanarayanan is hell bent on clearing of the machinery of Kichamani for a variety of reasons as Kichamani extends unlimited support to Bahuleyan, his opponent in the party and as Kichamani is the one solely responsible for sending Devan's brother to jail.

Into this turmoil arrives Shivani Menon, an award-winning documentary maker from Delhi,  with her crew composing of manager Chempakaraman and cameraman Sajan. As they are soon embroiled in probing on the illegal land acquisition by paradise group headed by Devanji, and plan to make a documentary on that, they fall into danger. Kichamani saves them and give them a shelter in his house. The essential love angle in the film is created by Sajan and Kichamani's sister Kalyani. The film progresses in the unending fights between Kichamani and Devanarayanan who strives for more power. The villain gathers every point to fight with Kichamani, which proves to be singular plot of the film.

Cast

References

External links
 

2007 films
2000s Malayalam-language films